The Romanian Bucovina Shepherd Dog is a breed  of livestock guardian dogs native to the historical Bukovina (Bucovina) region. The breed is closely related to other livestock guardian breeds of the region, such as the Greek Shepherd, Tornjak, or Šarplaninac. There are four subtypes: the Romanian Mioritic Shepherd Dog (old name Barac), the Carpathian Shepherd Dog (old name Zăvod), the Romanian Raven Shepherd Dog, and the standard Bucovina Shepherd Dog. In the FCI, this particular breed is officially dubbed the "Romanian Bucovina Shepherd".

History
It is a natural breed with its origin in the Carpathian Mountains (Romania). Special attention for the development of the breed arose in the regions of northeastern Romania, in the region of Bucovina, the well-known transhumance areas of the shepherds since immemorial times. Selection and improvement have led to the actual type. The breed is successfully used both for defending the flocks and herds and as watchdogs for households in the mentioned regions.

The first standard was written in 1982 and updated in 2001 by the Asociația Chinologică Româna (Romanian Kennel Club). The present standard, dating from March 29, 2002, was written and updated according to the model established in 1987 by the FCI General Assembly in Jerusalem.

In 2019, the Bucovina Shepherd Dog became definitely (fully) recognized by the FCI.

Temperament
The Bucovina Shepherd Dog was bred to protect sheep flocks and cattle herds, and proves courageous and very combative when potential predators are afoot. It is an excellent watchdog, having a very deep, powerful bark and being very alert when strangers enter its territory. During the night, it patrols around the property or herds. An adult Bucovina Sheepdog needs plenty of space to run around with a large back yard.

This breed is balanced, calm, very devoted, and loves children. It strongly mistrusts strangers.

Appearance
Large sized dog; commanding, haughty and proud.

Coat
Head and the front part of the legs are covered with short hair. On the body, hair is abundant, long, hair is much longer forming a mane; on the backside of the forequarters, the hair forms fringes; on the backside of hindquarters, the hair is longer and forms culottes. The tail is bushy.

Color
Main colour of coat is a clear white or white-beige with distinct patches of grey, black or black with red-fawn reflections. Black or grey ticks can appear on the legs. Brindle aspect of patches to be rejected.

Size

Conformation
The Bucovina Shepherd's head is massive, slightly elevated with respect to the back line. The skull is moderately wide. The stop is slightly marked. The nose is black well developed and wide. The muzzle has the shape of a truncated cone, of the same length as the skull, well developed. It becomes progressively narrow towards the extremity but it is never pointed.

The lips are thick, well applied, with strong pigmentation. This breed should have strong jaws, with healthy white teeth and a scissors bite. Level bite is allowed.

The cheeks are not prominent. The eyes are small in comparison with the dimensions of the skull, almond-shaped and slanting, chestnut colored or slightly lighter, never yellow.

 Its eyelids are well pigmented. The ears are high, “V” shaped, with rounded tips, fallen, and very close to the cheeks. The neck is moderately long, bulky and strong, without dewlap.

The muscular body is massive with a well-supported back. The chest is wide and tall, reaching the level of the elbows with well arched ribs. The skin is thick and dark gray. The hair is short on the head and forelegs. On the body, the hair is abundant, straight, thicker and harder, 2½- 3½ inches (6–9 cm.) long. The next layer of hair is shorter and thick, with a lighter color. On the neck, the hair is longer and forms a mane. On the backside of the legs, the hair forms fringes of moderate length.

The tail is bushy, covered with longer and thicker hair. When the dog is relaxed it tends to hold the tail low, reaching the point of the hock or even lower. When the dog is alert and is paying attention or is in action, the tail is elevated. In this case it may rise above the level of the back, sickle shaped.

Gait
Harmonious, elastic, well coordinated, giving the impression of effortless power. Preferred gait is the trot.

See also
 Dogs portal
 List of dog breeds
 Carpathian Shepherd Dog
 Romanian Mioritic Shepherd Dog
 Romanian Raven Shepherd Dog

References

External links

The Bucovina Shepherd Dog's page at ciobanesc.ro
Bucovina Shepherd Dogs' Breeders

FCI breeds
Dog breeds originating in Romania
Livestock guardian dogs